Sotiris Fakis (1934 – 29 October 1998) was a Greek professional footballer who played as a goalkeeper.

Club career
Fakis started his career at Amyna Ambelokipoi and the summer of 1957 he was transferred to AEK Athens. He did not manage to establish himself under the goalpost of the club as their main goalkeeper due the presence of Stelios Serafidis. During his spell with the yellow-blacks, he mostly played in friendly and Cup matches.
On 31 July 1960 he played in the championship play-off match against Panathinaikos at Karaiskakis Stadium, replacing Serafidis who was punished, where AEK lost by 2–1. He also played in the match of the inauguration of AEK Stadium on 3 January 1962 agaisnt Barcelona where AEK lost by 0–6.

In the summer of 1962, Fakis was transferred to Egaleo where he managed to establish himself as their main goalkeeper. He played at the club of Aigaleo for five seasons, until 1967 when he retired.

Personal life
Fakis worked at first as a glass shop employee and later at the UN Environment Department in Athens. He passed away on 29 October 1998 at the age of 64.

Honours

Egaleo
Beta Ethniki: 1964–65

References

Association football goalkeepers
1934 births
1998 deaths
Super League Greece players
AEK Athens F.C. players
Egaleo F.C. players
Footballers from Athens
Greek footballers